

Eadhæd was a medieval Bishop of Lindsey and sole Bishop of Ripon in the Medieval era.

Eadhæd was a companion of Chad of Mercia. He was consecrated in 678. He was expelled from Lindsey and was made Bishop of Ripon around 679. This was part of the process whereby Bishop Wilfrid of York's large diocese was broken into three parts, with new bishoprics established at York, Hexham and Ripon. Along with Eadhæd, Bosa was appointed to York and Eata was appointed to Hexham. The medieval chronicler Bede, in his work Historia ecclesiastica gentis Anglorum, barely mentions Eadhæd outside of the division of the diocese. It appears that the see of Ripon was especially created to find a place for Eadhæd after his expulsion from Lindsey, for bishops were not usually appointed to that see.

Notes

Citations

References

External links
 

Bishops of Lindsey
Bishops of Ripon (ancient)
7th-century English bishops